Piz Giuv (or Schattig Wichel) is a mountain of the Glarus Alps, located on the border between the cantons of Uri and Graubünden. At 3,096 metres above sea level, it is the highest mountain of the Glarus Alps lying west of the Oberalpstock. Its summit is situated between three valleys: the Fellital and Etzlital on the north side and the Val Giuv (Surselva) on the south side. The slightly lower Piz Nair lies on its east side

References

External links
Piz Giuv on Summitpost
Piz Giuv on Hikr

Mountains of Switzerland
Mountains of Graubünden
Mountains of the canton of Uri
Mountains of the Alps
Alpine three-thousanders
Graubünden–Uri border
Tujetsch